Apohtin or apohti is a traditional Cypriot dried food made by salted goat meat.

History
Apohtin's roots are traced during the Byzantine period as various texts refer to the preparation of meat (goat meat, beef, pork etc.) that was salted and then dried in the sun.

Preparation
In order to prepare apohtin, the animal is opened in the middle. Its head, intestines and tallow are removed. Then the meat is washed, salted and left (in a state to protect it from threats able to harm its quality, such as insects), to the sun for a period of three to four weeks in order to get dry. After that period, meat is sliced into small pieces, washed again and becomes available for any type of cooking. In Cyprus apohtin is a common meze that is served with alcoholic beverages (wine, zivania etc.).

A food similar to apohtin is noted in Santorini under the same name. That kind of apohti refers to a food based in pork tenderloin that is salted and dried in the sun. Also, the preparation of tsamarella, another Cypriot dish, is similar to apohtin's preparation except from the fact that unlike apohtin, in tsamarella, animal's bones are removed from the beginning.

See also
 List of dried foods

References 

Lunch meat
Cypriot cuisine
Goat dishes